The fourth season of Chicago Med, an American medical drama television series with executive producer Dick Wolf, and producers Michael Brandt, Peter Jankowski, Andrew Schneider and René Balcer (uncredited), was ordered on May 9, 2018. The season premiered on September 26, 2018, with a time slot change from Tuesday at 10:00 PM to Wednesday at 8:00 PM. The season concludes on May 22, 2019, and contained 22 episodes.

Cast

Main characters
 Nick Gehlfuss as Dr. Will Halstead, Attending Emergency Physician
 Yaya DaCosta as April Sexton, RN
 Torrey DeVitto as Dr. Natalie "Nat" Manning, Emergency Medicine/Pediatrics Fellow 
 Colin Donnell as Dr. Connor Rhodes, Attending Trauma Surgeon
 Brian Tee as LCDR Dr. Ethan Choi, Attending Emergency Physician
 Marlyne Barrett as Maggie Lockwood, RN, ED Charge Nurse
 Norma Kuhling as Dr. Ava Bekker, Cardiothoracic Surgery Attending
 S. Epatha Merkerson as Sharon Goodwin, Chief of Patient Services
 Oliver Platt as Dr. Daniel Charles, Chief of Psychiatry

Recurring characters
 Brennan Brown as Dr. Samuel "Sam" Abrams
 Ato Essandoh as Dr. Isidore Latham
 D. W. Moffett as Cornelius Rhodes
 Mekia Cox as Dr. Robin Charles
 Cynthia Addai-Robinson as Dr. Vicki Glass
 C.S. Lee as Bernard "Bernie" Kim
 Michel Gill as Robert Haywood (debut)
 Arden Cho as Emily Choi
 Molly Bernard as Dr. Elsa Curry (debut)
 Eddie Jemison as Dr. Stanley Stohl
 Heather Headley as Gwen Garrett
 Marc Grapey as Peter Kalmick
 Anna Enger Ritch as Agent Ingrid Lee
 Patti Murin as Dr. Nina Shore
 Roland Buck III as Dr. Noah Sexton
 Nate Santana as Dr. James Lanik
 Casey Tutton as Nurse Monique Lawson
 Lorena Diaz as Nurse Doris
 Amanda Marcheschi as Nurse Dina Garston
 Peter Mark Kendall as Joey Thomas
 Colby Lewis as Terry McNeal
 Dennis Cockrum as Ray Burke
 Devin Ratray as Tommy Burke
 Adam Petchel as Timothy "Tim" Burke
 Paula Newsome as Caroline Charles
 Ian Harding as Phillip Davis

Guest stars
 Rachel DiPillo as Dr. Sarah Reese (Season 4 premiere)

Crossover characters
 Jesse Spencer as Captain Matthew Casey
 Taylor Kinney as Lieutenant Kelly Severide
 Eamonn Walker as Chief Wallace Boden
 David Eigenberg as Lieutenant Christopher Hermann 
 Yuri Sardarov as Firefighter Brian "Otis" Zvonecek 
 Joe Minoso as Firefighter Joe Cruz
 Christian Stolte as Firefighter Randy "Mouch" McHolland 
 Miranda Rae Mayo as Firefighter Stella Kidd
 Randy Flagler as Firefighter Harold Capp
 Kara Killmer as Paramedic in Charge Sylvie Brett
 Jason Beghe as Sergeant Hank Voight
 Jesse Lee Soffer as Detective Jay Halstead
 Tracy Spiridakos as Detective Hailey Upton
 Patrick John Flueger as Adam Ruzek
 Marina Squerciati as Officer Kim Burgess

Episodes

Production

Casting
Having made her first appearance in the finale of season 3, Heather Headley is set to recur in season 4 as Chicago Med's new COO, Gwen Garrett.

On July 23, 2018, it was announced that Molly Bernard and Colby Lewis would be joining the cast as med students Elsa Curry and Terry McNeal respectively.

After three seasons as Dr. Sarah Reese, Rachel DiPillo left the series during the season premiere of Season 4.

On April 19, 2019, NBC announced that Colin Donnell and Norma Kuhling would depart the series at the end of the season due to creative reasons. Donnell and Kuhling appeared in the season 5 premiere to wrap up their character's storyline.

Ratings

Home media
The DVD release of season four was released in Region 1 on August 27, 2019.

References

External links
 
 

2018 American television seasons
2019 American television seasons
Chicago Med seasons